Magnus Jensen (1857–1915) was a lawyer and politician in Queensland, Australia. He was a Member of the Queensland Legislative Council.

Politics
Magnus Jensen was appointed to the Queensland Legislative Council from 4 May 1904. A lifetime appointment, he remained on the Council until his death on 16 May 1915.

Later life
Magnus Jensen died suddenly overnight at his home Lynfield off Lytton Road at Morningside on Sunday 16 May 1915. He was buried in the Bulimba Cemetery on Monday 17 May 1915.

See also
 Members of the Queensland Legislative Council, 1900–1909; 1910–16
 Astrea, one of his former homes (now heritage listed)

References

Members of the Queensland Legislative Council
1857 births
1915 deaths
Burials in Balmoral Cemetery, Brisbane